Kuroch may refer to:
 Kuroch, Iran
 Kuroch, Greater Poland Voivodeship